Paul Wilson (23 November 1950 – 18 September 2017) was an Indian-born Scottish professional footballer, who played for Celtic, Motherwell and Partick Thistle. His football career peaked in season 1974–75 after being moved to play as a striker when he scored 29 goals for Celtic, including two in that season's Scottish Cup final win. He played for Scotland that season, making him the only non-white player to represent the full Scotland team in the 20th century, and the first footballer with Asian origins to represent any of Scotland, England, Wales and Northern Ireland at senior level.

Following his mother's death, his enthusiasm for football diminished. He left the professional game at the age of 29.

Early years
Wilson was born in Bangalore, India. His Scottish father was stationed there with the Royal Air Force. His mother was Indian of Dutch-Portuguese origin. The family moved to Scotland when Wilson was one year old, living first in the Dennistoun district of Glasgow then in the town of Milngavie in the northern outskirts.

Career

Club
Celtic manager Jock Stein signed Wilson for the club in 1967 and immediately farmed him out to Junior club, Maryhill, to gain experience before returning to Celtic. Wilson was part of a group of young players named the Quality Street Gang by the Scottish media. He was one of many in that group who gradually replaced Celtic's Lisbon Lions team which had won the 1967 European Cup Final. Wilson's senior debut was in a European Cup 9–0 win at Celtic Park against KPV Kokkola in 1970 in which he scored twice.

Wilson was a quick footballer able to shoot with either foot. He was largely deployed by Stein on the wing where he felt Wilson's pace would be useful. Wilson disliked playing wide, preferring to play more centrally. He had dark skin tone and received racist abuse in his football career during Old Firm games against rivals Rangers

Wilson became a first team regular in August 1973. He ended season 1973–74 in Scottish football with a league winners' medal but did not feature in the squad for the 1974 Scottish Cup Final, a 3–0 win over Dundee United.

Stein moved the fast and elegant Wilson to play up front for the 1974–75 season where he outscored his friend and strike partner, Kenny Dalglish, with 29 goals. This culminated with Wilson scoring two headed goals in the 3–1 victory over Airdrie in the 1975 Scottish Cup Final. This was also the season he was selected to play for Scotland.

Wilson's mother died in the week leading up to the final against Airdrie. He later stated his mother's death was the source of his waning enthusiasm for football. This was not helped by a niggling injury requiring cortisone injections. Wilson did though collect a second championship winning medal in 1976–77 when he had been a regular until Alfie Conn joined in March that season. Wilson remained at Celtic until 1978 when he was out of favour under Billy McNeill's management. At Celtic he made 226 appearances in all competitions, scoring 62 goals including six in matches against Rangers.

Next Wilson moved to Motherwell for one season. He then finished his senior career at the end of the 1980 season with Partick Thistle at the age of 29.

After his spell at Thistle he was tempted into junior football by ex-Celtic teammate Jimmy Johnstone with Blantyre Celtic, winning a junior international cap.

International
Wilson gained one international cap for Scotland. On 5 February 1975, Willie Ormond sent him on as a 75th-minute substitute for Kenny Burns in a European Championship qualifier. The 1–1 draw was against Spain in Valencia in which Joe Jordan had put the Scots ahead. Wilson remarked, "I nearly scored but their keeper just got his hands to my effort. I was as sick as a dog. I was so proud to get my one cap."

Andrew Watson collected three full caps in the 1880s. Wilson was the only non-white of the 727 players to be selected by the full Scotland international team during the 20th century. The book "'Race', Sport and British Society" notes Wilson's Scotland outing was a full three years before Viv Anderson became the first black player to play for England: "Anderson's selection was heralded as a significant step forward for black representation in football; Wilson's selection for Scotland was ignored," wrote the authors. Wilson was the first player of Asian descent to have represented any of Scotland, England, Wales and Northern Ireland at senior level. The third non-white player to be capped by Scotland was Nigel Quashie in 2004.

Honours
Celtic
 Scottish Football League: 1973–74, 1976–77
 Scottish Cup: 1974–75, 1976–77
 Scottish League Cup:  1974–75
Runner-up 1973–74, 1975–76, 1976–77, 1977–78
 Glasgow Cup:  1974–75 (shared)
 Drybrough Cup:  1974–75

See also
 List of Scotland international footballers born outside Scotland

References

External links

1950 births
2017 deaths
Footballers from Bangalore
Scottish footballers
Scotland international footballers
Scotland junior international footballers
Scottish Junior Football Association players
Scottish people of Indian descent
Scottish people of Dutch descent
Scottish people of Portuguese descent
Indian people of Scottish descent
Indian people of Dutch descent
Indian people of Portuguese descent
Indian emigrants to Scotland
British sportspeople of Indian descent
British Asian footballers
Anglo-Indian people
Celtic F.C. players
Drumchapel Amateur F.C. players
Motherwell F.C. players
Partick Thistle F.C. players
Maryhill F.C. players
Scottish Football League players
People from Milngavie
People educated at St Ninian's High School, Kirkintilloch
Blantyre Celtic F.C. players
Place of death missing
Association football midfielders